The European Intellectual Property Institutes Network (EIPIN) is a cooperation network of intellectual property (IP) institutions, organizing conferences. It was founded in 1999. Its aim is "to facilitate and increase cooperation among IP institutions and students in Europe".

Its members are:
 Centre for International Intellectual Property Studies (CEIPI), University of Strasbourg, France
 Magister Lvcentinvs, University of Alicante, Spain
 Queen Mary Intellectual Property Research Institute, London, United Kingdom
 Munich Intellectual Property Law Center (MIPLC), LL.M. Program, Munich, Germany
 Intellectual Property Law and Knowledge Management (IPKM), Maastricht University

See also 
 Intellectual property organization

References

External links 
 European Intellectual Property Institutes Network
 European Intellectual Property Institutes Network at the Munich Intellectual Property Law Center (MIPLC)
 European Intellectual Property Institutes Network at the Queen Mary Intellectual Property Research Institute (QMIPRI)

Organizations established in 1999
Intellectual property organizations